Ardeadoris angustolutea is a species of colourful sea slug, a dorid nudibranch, a shell-less marine gastropod mollusc in the family Chromodorididae. It was transferred to the genus Ardeadoris on the basis of DNA evidence.

Distribution 
This species was described from Ruby Reef,  Great Barrier Reef, Queensland, Australia. It occurs in the tropical Indo-West Pacific regions, with confirmed sightings from the Philippines, Thailand, Guam, Hawaii and the Marshall Islands.

Description
The mantle in this species is an almost translucent white in colour. The mantle border ranges in colour from opaque white to orange-yellow. The midline of the body has a more opaque line that runs from the rhinophores to the posterior branchia (gills).  The rhinophores and branchia have an orange-brown tint.

Ecology
The exact food source for this sea slug is not yet known but the type specimen was found on a purple sponge species which is probably its food.

References

Chromodorididae
Gastropods described in 1990